The 30th anniversary of Ukrainian independence was a celebration of Ukrainian independence held from 22 to 24 August 2021, marking 30 years of Ukrainian independence from the Soviet Union. As part of the celebrations, more than 150 events were held across the country under the auspices of the Ministry of Culture and Information Policy.

Celebrations 
As part of the 30th anniversary of Ukrainian independence, more than 150 events were held throughout Ukraine with the official support of Ukraine's Ministry of Culture and Information Policy. Celebrations were held under the slogan of "You are my only one", meant to symbolise the struggle for Ukrainian independence across several generations. Delegations from 30 different countries and international organisations attended the events.

22 August 

 Unveiling and awarding of the  prize
 Liturgy at Saint Sophia Cathedral, Kyiv with the attendance of Bartholomew I of Constantinople
 "Where we are, there is Ukraine" forum within the

23 August 

 Raising of the flag of Ukraine at the geographic centre of Ukraine in Dobrovelychkivka, Cherkasy Oblast
 Inaugural summit of the Crimean Platform
 Inaugural summit of the Kyiv Summit of First Ladies and Gentlemen
 Performance at the National Opera of Ukraine for leaders of foreign nations

24 August 

 Kyiv Independence Day Parade, including an artillery salute on Trukhaniv Island and a naval parade in the Dnieper
 Naval parade in Odesa
 Concert by Andrea Bocelli, Tina Karol, and Jamala in Constitution Square
 "Independence is in our DNA" festive show at Olimpiyskiy National Sports Complex
 Extraordinary session of the Verkhovna Rada, where the draft law on the greater coat of arms of Ukraine is adopted

Other events 
In addition to the main events of 22–24 August, several events were held throughout 2021 in recognition of Ukraine's 30th anniversary. The Ukraine 30 Forum was founded and organised in honour of the anniversary. Several events honouring veterans of the Russo-Ukrainian War were also held throughout Kyiv, including the March of the Defenders. The  satellite was planned to be launched in 2021 as part of the revival of the Ukrainian space programme, but its launch was postponed until January 2022 on the decision of SpaceX, the company responsible for launching the satellite.

A series of four commemorative coins (worth ₴5, ₴10, ₴50, and ₴250) were issued by the National Bank of Ukraine as part of celebrations, as well as a singular bullion coin (worth ₴1).

Display of the Constitution of Pylyp Orlyk 
From 16 August to 14 November 2021, the exhibition "Rarities of the Ukrainian Cossack State — Hetmanship of the 17th and 18th centuries: To the 30th anniversary of Ukraine's Independence" was held at St. Sophia's Cathedral in Kyiv. The exhibition included the original Latin version of the Constitution of Pylyp Orlyk (in particular the constitution's second and third articles) and other historical objects, such as Ivan Mazepa's bulawa and a series of five universals issued by Mazepa between 1687 and 1702.

The display of the Constitution of Pylyp Orlyk was noted by Dmytro Kuleba, Ukraine's foreign minister, as a reminder of Ukraine's ownership of Crimea. In particular, he noted the second article, which established the inviolability of Ukraine's borders, and the third article, which called for the establishment of an alliance with the Crimean Khanate.

Infrastructure construction 
As part of President Volodymyr Zelenskyy's "Great Construction" programme and the celebrations, several investments in infrastructure were made. It was called the "Road of Unity", and underwent major construction in order to increase the highway's capacity to 40,000-50,000. As a result of the construction, the commute time between the western city of Lviv and Ukraine's easternmost Luhansk Oblast is expected to decrease by three hours. Six regional airports (in Dnipro, Kherson, Odesa, Rivne, Uzhhorod, and Vinnytsia) were also modernised, and an the construction of a new building complex for the  paediatric hospital.

Cost 
According to the Ministry of Finance of Ukraine, the total cost of all events planned by the Ukrainian government, as well as infrastructure projects, was ₴5.4 billion. Of the ₴5.4 billion, ₴100 million was spent on the celebrations.

Notes

References 

2021 in Ukraine
Anniversaries
Events in Ukraine